Meanings of Laser Class:

 Laser (dinghy): a class of sail boat
 Laser safety: classification of laser products concerning safety hazards